Giuseppe Pulie (born 26 December 1964) is a former Italian cross-country skier who competed from 1988 to 1996. He won a silver medal in the 4 × 10 km relay at the 1992 Winter Olympics in Albertville.

Pulie's best finish at the Nordic skiing World Championships was 14th in the 10 km event in 1991. His best finish in any race was seventh at a 1996 event in Austria.

Cross-country skiing results
All results are sourced from the International Ski Federation (FIS).

Olympic Games
 1 medal – (1 silver)

World Championships

World Cup

Season standings

Team podiums
 2 podiums 

Note:  Until the 1994 Olympics, Olympic races were included in the World Cup scoring system.

References

External links
 

1964 births
Living people
Italian male cross-country skiers
Cross-country skiers at the 1992 Winter Olympics
Olympic medalists in cross-country skiing
Sportspeople from the Province of Belluno
Medalists at the 1992 Winter Olympics
Olympic silver medalists for Italy
Olympic cross-country skiers of Italy
Cross-country skiers of Fiamme Gialle